The PR postcode area, also known as the Preston postcode area, is a group of eleven postcode districts in North West England, within four post towns. These cover south-west Lancashire (including Preston, Chorley and Leyland) and north Merseyside (including Southport).



Coverage
The approximate coverage of the postcode districts:

|-
! style="background:#FFFFFF;"|PR0
| style="background:#FFFFFF;"|PRESTON
| style="background:#FFFFFF;"|Express Gifts
| style="background:#FFFFFF;"|non-geographic
|-
! PR1
| PRESTON
| City Centre, Avenham, Broadgate, Deepdale, Fishwick, St. Matthew's, Penwortham
| City of Preston, South Ribble
|-
! PR2
| PRESTON
| Ashton On Ribble, Brookfield, Cadley, Fulwood, Grimsargh, Haighton, Ingol, Larches, Lea, Ribbleton, Riversway, Sharoe Green, Tanterton
| City of Preston
|-
! PR3
| PRESTON
| Barnacre-with-Bonds, Barton, Bilsborrow, Bonds, Bowgreave, Broughton, Cabus, Calder Vale, Chipping, Claughton, Forton, Garstang, Goosnargh, Great Eccleston, Inglewhite, Little Eccleston, Longridge, Myerscough, Oakenclough, Pilling, Ribchester, St Michael's On Wyre, Scorton, Whittingham, Winmarleigh
| Fylde, City of Preston, Ribble Valley, Wyre
|-
! PR4
| PRESTON
| Becconsall, Catforth, Clifton, Cottam, Eaves, Elswick, Freckleton, Hesketh Bank, Hutton, Inskip, Kirkham, Lea Town, Longton, Much Hoole, New Longton, Newton, Tarleton, Thistleton, Treales, Roseacre and Wharles, Walmer Bridge, Warton, Wesham, Woodplumpton, Wrea Green
| Fylde, City of Preston, South Ribble, West Lancashire
|-
! PR5
| PRESTON
| Bamber Bridge, Coupe Green, Cuerdale, Cuerden, Gregson Lane, Higher Walton, Hoghton, Lostock Hall, Riley Green, Samlesbury, Walton-le-Dale, Walton Park, Walton Summit
| South Ribble, Chorley
|-
! PR6
| CHORLEY
| Abbey Village, Adlington, Anderton, Anglezarke, Astley Village, Brindle, Brinscall, Clayton-le-Woods, Heapey, Heath Charnock, Wheelton, White Coppice, Whittle-le-Woods, Withnell
| Chorley
|-
! PR7
| CHORLEY
| Adlington, Buckshaw Village, Charnock Richard, Coppull, Eccleston, Euxton, Heath Charnock, Heskin
| Chorley
|-
! PR8
| SOUTHPORT
| Ainsdale, Birkdale, Blowick, Scarisbrick
| Sefton, West Lancashire
|-
! PR9
| SOUTHPORT
| Banks, Churchtown, Crossens, Marshside
| Sefton, West Lancashire
|-
! style="background:#FFFFFF;"| PR11
| style="background:#FFFFFF;"|PRESTON
| style="background:#FFFFFF;"|Great Universal Stores/Department for Work and Pensions delivering to its address in PR1
| style="background:#FFFFFF;"|non-geographic
|-
! PR25
| LEYLAND
| Leyland, Clayton-le-Woods, Cuerden, Farington
| South Ribble, Chorley
|-
! PR26
| LEYLAND
| Leyland, Bretherton, Croston, Farington Moss, Moss Side, Ulnes Walton
| South Ribble, Chorley
|}

The PR25 and PR26 districts were formed out of the PR5 district in January 2001. Leyland became a new post town at this time, having previously been part of the Preston post town.

Map

See also
Postcode Address File
List of postcode areas in the United Kingdom

References

External links
Royal Mail's Postcode Address File
A quick introduction to Royal Mail's Postcode Address File (PAF)

City of Preston, Lancashire
Postcode areas covering North West England
PR Postcode Area
Borough of West Lancashire